Monte Colombo is a frazione and former comune (municipality) in the Province of Rimini in the Italian region Emilia-Romagna, located about  southeast of Bologna and about  south of Rimini.

Monte Colombo borders the following municipalities: Coriano, Gemmano, Montescudo, San Clemente.

History
Although the area housed some residences and scattered settlements in the Roman and Byzantine Ages, the current town originated in the Middle Ages from a castle built here by the Malatesta family. After the latter's fall and a short period under Cesare Borgia, Monte Colombo was acquired by the Republic of Venice, which however ceded it to the Papal States in 1509–10.

On 1 January 2016 Monte Colombo merged Montescudo to form the new municipality of Montescudo-Monte Colombo.

Main sights
Malatesta castle, with the annexed burg (14th century)
Castle (fortified burg) of San Savino, dating to the late 15th century
Bridge over the Rio Calamino  (18th century)

References

Former municipalities of Emilia-Romagna
Frazioni of the Province of Rimini
Cities and towns in Emilia-Romagna